The longtail sole (Apionichthys dumerili) is a species of sole in the family Achiridae. It was described by Johann Jakob Kaup in 1858. It inhabits the Amazon, Corantijn, Grajaú, Orinoco, and Oyapock rivers.

The longtail sole is currently ranked as Least Concern by the IUCN redlist, due to a lack of known major threats, although it notes that the species is harvested as bycatch in shrimp trawls at an undetermined rate. The longtail sole is also marketed in the aquarium hobby.

References

Pleuronectiformes
Fish described in 1858